Mount Valinski is a rock peak (1,640 m) standing just south of Millington Glacier and 4 nautical miles (7 km) west of Ramsey Glacier in the Queen Maud Mountains. It was named by the Advisory Committee on Antarctic Names (US-ACAN) for Joseph Edward Valinski, U.S. Navy, radio operator on U.S. Navy Operation Highjump (1946–47) Flight 8, February 16, 1947, when this feature was photographed from the air.

Mountains of the Ross Dependency
Dufek Coast